P. greggii may refer to:

Peniocereus greggii
Pinus greggii

See also
 Greggii